Universal Bank headquartered in West Covina California, is a commercial bank with five branch locations in West Covina, Arcadia, Rosemead, Monterey Park and Eagle Rock, California. The Bank was first established on November 17, 1954, and is a wholly-owned subsidiary of Universal Financial, Inc.

Universal Bank focuses on providing real estate financing in the local community.

External links
 Universal Bank homepage

Banks based in California
Banks established in 1954
Chinese American banks
Chinese-American culture in California
Companies based in Los Angeles County, California
Privately held companies based in California